The Church of St. Mary with St. Peter, mostly known as Oldham Parish Church, is the Church of England parish church for Oldham in Greater Manchester, England. It forms part of the Diocese of Manchester, and is one of several Grade II* listed buildings in Greater Manchester. 
A church building had existed on the site since 1280. During this time, a small chapel stood on the site to serve the local townships of Oldham, Chadderton, Royton and Crompton. This was later replaced by an Early English Gothic Church in the 15th century. With the coming of the Industrial Revolution, the population of Oldham increased at a rapid rate (from under 2,000 in 1714, to over 32,000 by 1831). The rapid growth of the local population warranted that the building be rebuilt into the current structure. Though the budget was originally agreed at £5,000, the final cost of building was £30,000, one third of which was spent on the crypt structure. Alternative designs by Sir Charles Barry, the designer of the Palace of Westminster, although now regarded by some as superior, were rejected. In 1805 the churchyard was enlarged and nearby Church Lane, Oldham became a cul-de-sac severing an ancient route through the town. The previous continuance of the road (Church Street) was lowered by 6 feet and became an extension of the recently created Church Terrace.

The church its present form, dates from 1830 and was designed in the Gothic Revival Style by Richard Lane, a Manchester-based architect. It has been designated by English Heritage as a Grade II* listed building. It was linked with St Mary's Church in Prestwich and together the sites were principal churches of the ancient ecclesiastical parish of Prestwich-cum-Oldham.

The peal of twelve bells was cast in 1922 by John Taylor & Co of Loughborough. An additional flat 6th was cast in 1978. The church also retains its original bell, cast in 1722 by Abraham Rudhall II of Gloucester.

Organists 
 Jack Pickford
 Jason Hawkins
Michael Farrer

See also

Listed buildings in Oldham
List of churches in Greater Manchester
History of Oldham

References

Buildings and structures in Oldham
History of Oldham
Church of England church buildings in Greater Manchester
Grade II* listed churches in Greater Manchester
Oldham
Oldham